The Eastern Premier Soccer League (EPSL) is a United States Adult Soccer Association and a National Independent Soccer Association affiliated Amateur Elite League that includes teams from the Eastern United States. Currently the league has members from Connecticut, Maryland, Massachusetts, New Jersey, New York, Pennsylvania, and Virginia.

The league is a partnership between the New York City based Cosmopolitan Soccer League and the Maryland Major Soccer League. It is also an affiliate of the National Independent Soccer Association, a professionally sanctioned third division soccer association.

History 
The league was announced on July 23, 2020, in a joint effort between the Cosmopolitan Soccer League and Maryland Major Soccer League to create a regional based multi-league promotion and relegation system in the United States. The league's goal is to have merit-based promotion from local amateur leagues, including champions, with the possibility of being relegated back into the local feeder leagues at the end of the season. The initial slate of members included many of the clubs that participated in the first division of the CSL the previous season.

In the following months, the EPSL added teams from additional leagues such as the Woodbridge Soccer League and United Premier Soccer League. On September 8, 2020, the league announced that the New Jersey-based Garden State Soccer League would become a feeder league for the EPSL. A future promotion spot in the Metropolitan Conference of the EPSL will be determined in a playoff between the champion of the GSSL and the champion of the Cosmopolitan Soccer League.

On September 4, 2020, the National Independent Soccer Association announced its latest amateur league affiliation with the EPSL. It joined the previously announced Gulf Coast Premier League and Midwest Premier League in having in having an affiliation with the third division association. The affiliation includes at least two merit-based spots in the NISA Independent Cup tournament and participation on the NISA Alliance Board.

2020-21 Season Teams

Metropolitan Conference

Mid-Atlantic Conference

Northeast Conference

2021-22 Season Teams

Northeast Conference

Metropolitan Conference

Delaware River Conference

Mid-Atlantic Conference

Year by year

Champions

EPSL Tier League System 

| 
| 
|}

References

External links 
 Eastern Premier Soccer League website

United States Adult Soccer Association leagues
 
Soccer leagues in the United States
Soccer in New York (state)
Soccer in New York City
Soccer in New Jersey
Soccer in Pennsylvania
Soccer in Maryland
Soccer in Virginia
2020 establishments in New York (state)
2020 establishments in Maryland
Sports leagues established in 2020
Regional Soccer leagues in the United States